The 2003–04 season was the 75th season in the existence of FC Sochaux-Montbéliard and the club's third consecutive season in the top flight of French football. In addition to the domestic league, Sochaux participated in this season's editions of the Coupe de France, Coupe de la Ligue, and UEFA Cup. The season covered the period from 1 July 2003 to 30 June 2004.

First-team squad
Squad at end of season

Transfers

In

Out

Competitions

Overview

Ligue 1

League table

Results summary

Results by round

Matches

Coupe de France

Coupe de la Ligue

UEFA Cup

First round

Second round

Third round

Statistics

Goalscorers

References

FC Sochaux-Montbéliard seasons
Sochaux